Sheri Reynolds (born c. 1967) is an author of contemporary Southern fiction.

She was born and raised in rural South Carolina and lives on Virginia's eastern shore. She graduated from Conway High School in 1985, Davidson College in 1989, and Virginia Commonwealth University in 1992.

She is an associate professor and the Ruth and Perry Morgan Chair of Southern Literature at Old Dominion University in Norfolk, VA. Reynolds teaches creative writing and literature classes. She won the Outstanding Faculty Award from the State Council for Higher Education of Virginia in 2003, and in 2005, she received a grant from the Virginia Commission for the Arts in playwriting. She has also taught at Virginia Commonwealth University, The College of William and Mary, and Davidson College.

Her first play, Orabelle's Wheelbarrow, won the Women Playwrights' Initiative playwriting competition for 2005.

Selected works
Bitterroot Landing (1994)
The Rapture of Canaan, an Oprah's Book Club selection and New York Times bestseller (1997)
A Gracious Plenty (1999)
 The Firefly Cloak (2006)
The Sweet In-Between (2008)

External links
 Orabelle's Wheelbarrow can be read at Blackbird, an online journal of literature and the arts

1960s births
Living people
20th-century American novelists
21st-century American novelists
American women novelists
Novelists from South Carolina
Davidson College alumni
Virginia Commonwealth University alumni
Old Dominion University faculty
American academics of English literature
American women dramatists and playwrights
Novelists from Virginia
College of William & Mary faculty
Davidson College faculty
20th-century American women writers
21st-century American women writers
20th-century American dramatists and playwrights
American women non-fiction writers
21st-century American non-fiction writers